Frank Atwood is a fictional character in the American television series The O.C.

Frank Atwood may also refer to:
 Frank Jarvis Atwood (1956–2022), American child killer convicted of the murder of Vicki Lynne Hoskinson
 Frank Atwood Huntington (1836–1925), American inventor